Sadashiva Malla was a king of the Malla dynasty and the fifth king of Kantipur. He succeeded his father Mahendra Malla and ruled from 1574 to 1578.

Reign 
Sadashiva Malla succeeded as the King of Kantipur after the death of Mahendra Malla. He was involved in extreme profligacy and a feeling of resentment arose among the public during his short reign. He was supposedly once captured and beaten severely by the public.

He was eventually driven out of Kantipur by his brother and the general public, and he took shelter in Bhadgaon where he died in 1581. After his deposition, his brother, Shivasimha Malla, took charge of the kingdom and expanded the territory of Kantipur.

References 

16th-century Nepalese people
Malla rulers of Kantipur
Year of birth unknown

Nepalese monarchs
1581 deaths